San Pedro Street is a major north–south thoroughfare in Los Angeles, California, running from Little Tokyo in Downtown Los Angeles to West Rancho Dominguez.
San Pedro Street was one of the earliest roadways, along with Alameda Street, between central Los Angeles and the Port of Los Angeles; much of the road's original alignment south of Jefferson Boulevard has been renamed Avalon Boulevard.

The portion of San Pedro Street north of 1st Street was renamed Judge John Aiso Street in 1999.

Landmarks

 Edward R. Roybal Federal Building and United States Courthouse
 Union Center for the Arts (former Japanese Union Church of Los Angeles)
 San Pedro Firm Building
 Little Tokyo
 Japanese American Cultural & Community Center
 The Japanese American Veterans Memorial Court 
 James Irvine Japanese Garden
 Toy District
 Skid Row
 Fashion District

Public transportation
Metro Local lines 48 and 51 serve San Pedro Street; Line 48 runs in South LA and line 51 in Downtown LA.

The Metro A Line serves a light rail station in the center median of Washington Boulevard about half a block east of that street.

Streets in Los Angeles
Streets in Los Angeles County, California
Downtown Los Angeles
Little Tokyo, Los Angeles
South Los Angeles